Gerald "Jerry" Edward Korn (January 25, 1921 in West Roxbury, Massachusetts – October 16, 2010 in Parsonsfield, Maine, USA) was a pilot and author. He was married to Barbara Henderson Korn and they have three daughters; Ellen, Margaret and Susan.

Early life
Upon graduation from Roxbury Memorial High School, Korn studied journalism at Boston University. He left to become a reporter for the Boston Globe at Fort Devens in Ayer, Massachusetts.

Military career
Korn was awarded the Distinguished Flying Cross as a B-24 co-pilot in World War II with the Eighth Air Force. He flew a total of 35 combat missions.
Before his discharge in September 1945 he flew experimental flights out of Bedford, Massachusetts, for radar testing.

Post-war
After leaving the USAAF he became a reporter for the Associated Press progressing to become an editor for Collier's and Life magazines. In 1961 he moved to Time-Life Books first as an assistant text editor then he served for 12 years as the managing editor until 1982.

He is the author of many books including:

 The Atom, the Core of All Matter (1959)
 Raising of the Queen (1962)
 War on the Mississippi (1985, part of Time-Life Book Inc.'s series The Civil War)
 The Fight for Chattanooga: Chickamauga to Missionary Ridge (1985, part of Time-Life Book Inc.'s series The Civil War)
 Pursuit to Appomattox: The Last Battles (1987, part of Time-Life Book Inc.'s series The Civil War)

References

External links

1921 births
2010 deaths
American book editors
United States Army Air Forces bomber pilots of World War II
Recipients of the Distinguished Flying Cross (United States)
Boston University College of Communication alumni
People from West Roxbury, Boston
Life (magazine) people
Historians from Massachusetts
Military personnel from Massachusetts